Xiaomi Mi1, (often referred to as Xiaomi Phone), is a high-end, Android smartphone produced by Xiaomi. The device uses a Qualcomm Snapdragon S3 (dual core, 1.5 GHz) as its CPU and an Adreno 220 as its GPU. The device is initially sold at a price of ¥1999. When it was released, the device received more than 300,000 pre-orders in the first 34 hours.

On 20 December 2011, the company announced a partnership with Chinese telco China Unicom. The plan was to offer one million custom Mi1 models at ¥2699 at Unicom stores on various two to three-year term contracts.

Specifications

Hardware
The casing of the Xiaomi Mi1 is mostly made from plastic, with SIM card slots located inside. The microUSB port is located at the bottom of the device with the audio jack located at the top of the device. The volume keys were located on the right side of device meanwhile the power key was located at the top of the device. Near the top of the device are a front-facing camera and proximity sensors. The device is widely available in white, pink, blue, yellow, purple and grey color finishes. The device's display is a 4-inch, TFT capacitive touchscreen with a resolution of ~245ppi.

The model is one of two variations of the Xiaomi Mi1 Xiaomi created before creating the Xiaomi Mi2. The device comes a 1930mAh battery.

Software

The Xiaomi Mi1 ships with Android and Xiaomi's MIUI user experience.

Updates
Updates for the Xiaomi Mi1 is available in three channels: stable, developer and daily. New stable builds are usually available every month with major changes between each update, new developer builds are usually available every week with small but sometimes significant features added between each update and new beta builds are usually available every Wednesdays and usually only contain small fixes and optimizations. Beta builds are only available to some beta testers selected on MIUI's community forums. To update between versions, users usually use an over-the-air updater application.

See also 
 Xiaomi
 MIUI
 Comparison of smartphones

References 

Android (operating system) devices
Discontinued flagship smartphones
Mi 1
Mobile phones with user-replaceable battery